The Laureus World Sports Award for Comeback of the Year is an annual award honouring the achievements of those individuals or teams who have made a comeback performance in the world of sports. It was first awarded in 2000 as one of the seven constituent awards presented during the Laureus World Sports Awards. The awards are presented by the Laureus Sport for Good Foundation, a global organisation involved in more than 150 charity projects supporting 500,000 young people. The first ceremony was held on 25 May 2000 in Monte Carlo, at which Nelson Mandela gave the keynote speech. , a shortlist of six nominees for the award comes from a panel composed of the "world's leading sports editors, writers and broadcasters". The Laureus World Sports Academy then selects the individual winner or winning team who is presented with a Laureus statuette, created by Cartier, at an annual awards ceremony held in various locations around the world. The awards are considered highly prestigious and are frequently referred to as the sporting equivalent of the "Oscars".

The inaugural winner of the award was American road cyclist Lance Armstrong. Having recovered from testicular cancer, which had spread to his brain, lungs and abdomen, he returned to cycling in 1998 and won the 1999 Tour de France. Following Armstrong's 2013 admission of doping, all his Laureus awards and nominations were rescinded. , the award has been won by a different individual sportsperson every year (six to women, fifteen to men), although ten teams have been nominated – the England men's cricket team (2005), Miami Heat (2007), the Great Britain national rugby league team (2008), Crusaders (2012), Queensland Reds (2012), European Ryder Cup Team (2013), Germany Men's Olympic Eights Team (2013), Oracle Team USA (2014), FC Barcelona (2018) and Chapecoense (2018). Tennis players dominate the winners list, with seven awards, while athletes, golfers and rugby union players have won twice. The 2021 winner of the award was the Canadian snowboarder Maxence Parrot.

List of winners and nominees

Statistics
Statistics are correct as of 2021 awards.

References

Comeback of the Year
Awards established in 2000